Maud Independent School District is a small school district located in Maud, Texas (USA).  At the beginning of the 2005–2006 school year it had an enrollment of 471 students in grades pre-kindergarten through twelve.  On October 7, 2005, the district celebrated its 100-year anniversary. There are 72 employees.

In 2009, the school district was rated "academically acceptable" by the Texas Education Agency.

References

External links
Maud ISD

School districts in Bowie County, Texas